The Miller Hull Partnership is an architectural firm based in Seattle, Washington, founded by David Miller and Robert Hull. The firm's major works in the domains of municipal, commercial, and residential architecture reflect a modernist aesthetic and a focus on user needs, geographic context, and ecological sustainability.

The firm has received many awards acknowledging its innovative "green" design approach and its contribution to the continued development of Pacific Northwest regional architecture.

History 
Miller Hull was founded in 1977 after the dissolution of Rhone & Iredale, the Vancouver-based firm for which both future partners worked. The firm's first office was located in Seattle's Smith Tower. Early projects, such as a water quality testing lab in Seattle, Seattle Community College's Marine Technology Facility, and several earth-sheltered houses, demonstrated the architects' interests in resource conservation and innovative use of off-the-shelf materials to keep project costs within budget. 70% of the firm's projects involve public funding. The architects credit their economical, sustainable, and regionalist approach to building to their time in the US Peace Corps in the late 1960s and early 1970s, Miller in Brazil, and Hull in Afghanistan.

Founding partner Robert Hull died in 2014. During Hull's lifetime, the two architects traditionally worked in collaboration—one partner birthing an idea, and the other refining. In 2015, the firm employed 40 architects, 8 partners, 6 principals, and 8 associates, and had offices in Seattle and San Diego.

Awards and honors 
In addition to numerous publications, they are the recipients of the 2003 American Institute of Architects Architecture Firm Award, the AIA's highest honor. FAIA discussed the Miller/Hull Partnership’s work, including the Fisher Pavilion at the Seattle Center, one of the AIA Committee on the Environment’s (COTE) 2003 Top Ten Green Buildings in the Spotlight on Design Lecture Series held at the National Building Museum in 2003.

The firm was ranked #14 in the AIA's 2013 list of top 50 architectural firms. The Bullitt Center, a 50,000 square foot, Living Building Challenge certified office building in Seattle's Capitol Hill neighborhood, was named "Sustainable Building of the Year" by both World Architecture News and Metal Architecture Magazine, and has received numerous other awards for its innovative design.

Miller Hull's renovation of the Odegaard Undergraduate Library at the University of Washington received a 2014 AIA Honor Award for Interior Architecture.

Building projects

Gorton/Bounds Cabin
Marine Technology Facility, Seattle Central Community College
Art Studios, Evergreen State College
Novotny Cabin
Boeing Cafeteria
Bullitt Center
Marquand Retreat
University of Washington, Coaches Boat House
Olympic College, Shelton
Passenger-Only Ferry Terminal
Environmental Pavilion, 1996 Summer Olympics
NW Federal Credit Union
Lake Washington School District Resource Center
Tahoma National Cemetery
Point Robert's Border Station
North Kitsap Transportation Station
Water Pollution Control Laboratory
Discovery Park Visitors Center
Yaquina Head Interpretive Center
Hansman Residence
Campbell Orchard Residence
Ching Cabin
Michaels/Sisson Residence
Roddy/Bale Residence
Fremont Public Association
Vashon Island Transfer and Recycling Station
King Country Library Service Center
Bainbridge Island City Hall

Notes

References
 
 
The Miller|Hull Partnership: Public Works. New York: Princeton Architectural Press, 2009. 
Ojeda. Ten Houses, Miller|Hull Partnership. Gloucester: Rockport Publishers, 1999.  
 Stiles, Marc. Prominent Seattle Architect Robert Hull Dies, Puget Sound Business Journal, April 8, 2014

External links
 

Architecture firms based in Washington (state)
Companies based in Seattle